Tony Canzoneri (November 6, 1908 – December 9, 1959) was an American professional boxer. A three-division world champion, he held a total of five world titles. Canzoneri is a member of the exclusive group of boxing world champions who have won titles in three or more divisions. Canzoneri fought for championships between bantamweight and light welterweight.

Early life
When he was a teenager, he and his family moved to Staten Island, New York, where he campaigned most of his career. 

Canzoneri fit the mould of the typical American boxer of the era: He could box up to three or four times in one month and up to 24 or 25 times in one year, and he would seldom fight outside New York City, considered to be boxing's mecca at the time. Of his first 38 bouts, only one was fought west of New York City, and was in New Jersey.

Professional career

Two-division world champion
Canzoneri won his first title, the World Featherweight title, with a 15-round decision over Benny Bass on February 10, 1928. He defended the title once and then went up in weight and challenged World Lightweight Champion Sammy Mandell, losing by a decision in ten rounds. In 1930, Mandell was knocked out in the first round by Al Singer and lost his title and Canzoneri, who had already beaten Singer by a ten-round decision before, challenged Singer for the title on November 14, 1930, knocking him out in the first round to become a two division world champion. In defeat, Singer made history by becoming the first man, and only man up until John Mugabi, to both win and lose the title by knockout in the first round.

Three-division world champion
Canzoneri's first defense was a unification of sorts: He faced World Light Welterweight champion Jack Kid Berg, who was putting his title on the line and trying to take Canzoneri's lightweight crown. Canzoneri became a three-division world champion by knocking Berg out in the third round on April 24, 1931. Canzoneri, Barney Ross and Henry Armstrong were the only boxing champions in history allowed to hold two or more world titles simultaneously. (Sugar Ray Leonard became both the vacant World Super Middleweight and the World Light Heavyweight Champion in one night in 1988, but he could keep only one and chose to keep the Super Middleweight title.)

Regaining the light welterweight title
Canzoneri lost his world Light Welterweight Championship to Johnny Jadick and he lost to Jadick again in a rematch. Meanwhile, Canzoneri kept retaining his lightweight belt, defending it against the likes of Billy Petrolle and his brother Frankie Petrolle.

Jadick lost his belt to Battling Shaw and Canzoneri once again challenged for the World Light Welterweight title while keeping his Lightweight title. He beat Shaw by decision and recovered the world Light Welterweight Championship. In his next bout, versus Ross, he lost both belts when Ross beat him by a ten-round decision. There was an immediate rematch and Ross won again, this time by decision in 15.

Regaining the lightweight title
On May 10, 1935, he fought for the world lightweight title against Lou Ambers. Canzoneri won the World Lightweight title by outpointing Ambers over 15 rounds. After successfully defending his Lightweight title once, he lost it again in a rematch with Ambers by a 15-round decision. There was a rubber match between the two and Ambers once again won a decision in 15 rounds.

Later career
Canzoneri went on boxing professionally until 1939, but he never again challenged for a world title. Among other world champions that he beat were Frankie Klick, Baby Arizmendi, Jimmy McLarnin and Kid Chocolate.

Canzoneri had a record of 137 wins, 24 losses, 10 draws and 3 no decisions (Newspaper Decisions: 4-0-0). During his era, many states and countries still had no scoring on boxing fights, so each time a fight would go the scheduled number of rounds without a knockout, no decision would be made as to the winner. Newspapers, however, would fill this gap, giving their own opinion of which boxer had won the fight. He had 44 knockouts, and only one loss by knockout. Canzoneri was managed by Sammy Goldman.

He died of a heart attack in Manhattan at the age of 51. He is a member of the International Boxing Hall Of Fame.

Professional boxing record
All information in this section is derived from BoxRec, unless otherwise stated.

Official record

All newspaper decisions are officially regarded as “no decision” bouts and are not counted in the win/loss/draw column.

Unofficial record

Record with the inclusion of newspaper decisions in the win/loss/draw column.

See also
Lineal championship
List of lightweight boxing champions
List of The Ring world champions
List of boxing triple champions

References

External links
 
 
 Biography at boxingbiographies.co.uk
 Tony Canzoneri - CBZ profile
 https://boxrec.com/media/index.php/National_Boxing_Association%27s_Quarterly_Ratings:_1929
 https://boxrec.com/media/index.php/National_Boxing_Association%27s_Quarterly_Ratings:_1930
 https://boxrec.com/media/index.php/National_Boxing_Association%27s_Quarterly_Ratings:_1931
 https://boxrec.com/media/index.php/National_Boxing_Association%27s_Quarterly_Ratings:_1932
 https://boxrec.com/media/index.php/National_Boxing_Association%27s_Quarterly_Ratings:_1935
 https://boxrec.com/media/index.php/National_Boxing_Association%27s_Quarterly_Ratings:_1936
 https://boxrec.com/media/index.php/The_Ring_Magazine%27s_Annual_Ratings:_Featherweight--1920s
 https://boxrec.com/media/index.php/The_Ring_Magazine%27s_Annual_Ratings:_Lightweight--1920s
 https://boxrec.com/media/index.php/The_Ring_Magazine%27s_Annual_Ratings:_Lightweight--1930s
 https://boxrec.com/media/index.php/NBA_World_Light_Welterweight_Title_Fights
 https://titlehistories.com/boxing/na/usa/ny/nysac-l.html

1908 births
1959 deaths
Featherweight boxers
World featherweight boxing champions
American people of Italian descent
Light-welterweight boxers
International Boxing Hall of Fame inductees
Lightweight boxers
World lightweight boxing champions
People from Slidell, Louisiana
Sportspeople from Staten Island
American male boxers
Boxers from New York City